The India national under-17 football team represents India in international football at the under-17 level. Controlled by the All India Football Federation, the governing body for football in India, the team is part of the Asian Football Confederation and the South Asian Football Federation.

History

FIFA U-17 World Cup
India has participated for the first time in FIFA U-17 World Cup as hosts in the 2017 edition of the tournament. This was the first time ever that a team representing India would participate in the finals of a FIFA organized world tournament. India was placed in group A along with, United States, Ghana and Columbia. On 6 October 2017, India played their first ever match in FIFA-U17 World Cup history against United States in front of 47,000 spectators.  But unfortunately, India lost the match by 3–0. India played their Second match against Colombia. In 82nd minute Jeakson Singh Thounaojam became the first Indian goalscorer in any FIFA tournament. In the third match of group stage, India faced Ghana where they lost 4–0, finishing bottom of the group A. India also failed to qualify for 2019 edition when they lost by 1–0 in the Quarter final match against South Korea at the 2018 AFC U-16 Championship.

AFC U-16 Championship
The AFC U-16 Championship is the top level tournament for under-16 football teams in Asia and began in 1985. India participated in the tournament for the first time in 1990. They were knocked-out of the tournament in the group stage, finishing third in their four-team group with one against Jordan. The team qualified again for the tournament in 1996 where they finished last in their group which included Bahrain, China, Iran, and Thailand. The team lost three of their four matches, with their sole victory coming against China.Dipayan Bose scored 12 goals in the match most by any player .He is currently studying in Allen.

India qualified again for the tournament in 2002, where they reached the quarter-final round, in their best result to date. The team took on South Korea in the quarter-finals but lost 3–1, and thus failed to advance further. Following the 2002 tournament, India qualified for the next tournament in Japan. Two defeats and one victory in the group stage saw India finish third in their group, and were knocked out from the tournament.

After failing to qualify for 2006 AFC U-17 Championship, India qualified for the 2008 edition. Two defeats before a sole victory over Indonesia saw India once again make it no further than the group stage. The same result followed in 2012, only this time with no wins in the group stage.

India, for the seventh time, participated in the tournament in 2016 with the nation hosting the tournament. Despite home advantage, India once again could not make it beyond the group stage and finished last in their group which consisted of themselves, Iran, Saudi Arabia, and United Arab Emirates.

India qualified for 2018 AFC U-16 Championship by participating in the qualification round. India defeated Palestine, 3–0, then played a 2–2 draw against Nepal and finally qualified for the 2018 edition when they played a goalless draw against the defending champion Iraq. India played its group stage matches against Vietnam, Iran and Indonesia at the 2018 edition in Malaysia. They defeated Vietnam by 1–0, then held Iran to a goal less draw and finally qualified for the knock out stages by holding Indonesia to a 0–0 draw. In the quarter finals they were defeated 1-0 by heavy weights South Korea, ending their run in the tournament.

India has also qualified for the 2020 AFC U-16 Championship by participating in the qualifying round. In the first game they defeated Turkmenistan 5–0. In the second game also they defeated Bahrain by an identical score line. They finally qualified for the finals by holding Uzbekistan to a 1–1 draw. India is clubbed with Korea Republic, Australia and Uzbekistan in Group C for the tournament. But the tournament was called of due to COVID-19.

India qualified for the 2023 AFC U-17 Asian Cup for third consecutive time. India defeated Maldives by 5-0, Kuwait by 3-0 and Myanmar by 4-1 but fell to Saudi Arabia by 2 goals still India founded a net within last minutes of the game. India qualified as second placed best ranked teams making their 9th appearance in the tournament.

SAFF U-15 Championship

In 2009, the SAFF U-16 Championship was launched. India participated in the first edition of the tournament in 2011. After an opening day surprise defeat to Pakistan, India qualified for the next round after defeating the Maldives 5–0. India then made it to the final, defeating Nepal on penalties, but again lost to Pakistan in the final 2–1. India fared much better in the 2013 edition, finishing first in their group of Bangladesh and Sri Lanka, before defeating Afghanistan in the semi-final on penalties. In the final, India defeated Nepal 1–0 to win the tournament for the first time.

As reigning champions, India entered the 2015 edition of the tournament with a 5–0 victory over Sri Lanka. India then suffered a 2–1 defeat to Bangladesh to finish second in the group, and but still qualified for the semi-finals. In the semi-finals, India once again defeated Nepal 1–0, but lost to Bangladesh in the final on penalties.

At the 2017 edition India entered into semi-final, defeating Maldives and Nepal by 9–0 and 2–1 respectively. In the semi-final they defeated Bhutan by 3–0 and entered to the final and faced Nepal again and defeated them by 2–1 to become SAFF champion for the second time after 2013.

2019 edition of the tournament was their third title. In this edition the tournament was played in round robin, thus India played against all other teams and managed to win all their matches without a goal conceded. In the final they faced Nepal whom they easily defeated by 7−0 margin, thus scoring 28 goals in 5 matches, becoming champions for the third time.

2022 edition was their fourth title. In this edition, India was clubbed with Bhutan and Nepal. India began their SAFF campaign with a comfortable 3-0 win over Bhutan but surprisingly lost to Nepal by 1-3. Though, India qualified for semi finals where they defeated Bangladesh by 1-2 score line. India again faced Nepal in the finals where now they defeated Nepal with 4-0.

AIFF Youth Cup

The AIFF Youth Cup was first competed for in 2016. It was organized by the All India Football Federation (AIFF) as a preparatory tournament for the India under-17 team for the 2016 AFC U-16 Championship and the 2017 FIFA U-17 World Cup. The first tournament was held from 15 May to 25 May 2016 at the Tilak Maidan Stadium in Vasco, Goa. A total of five teams participated in the tournament after being invited by the All India Football Federation. The final was won 2–1 by South Korea over the United States.

Coaching staff

The following officials are present Coaching staffs for the U17 team.

Players

U-17 Squad

Past squads
FIFA U-17 World Cup
 2017 FIFA U-17 WC Squad
AFC U-16 Championship squads
 2018 AFC U-16 Championship squad
 2016 AFC U-16 Championship squad
 2012 AFC U-16 Championship squad

Recent results and fixtures
For past match results of the national team, see the team's results page.

Matches in the last 12 months, and future scheduled matches

India U–16 fixtures

India U-17 fixtures

Competitive history

FIFA U-17 World Cup

 Red border indicates the team played as the host of the tournament.

AFC U-17 Asian Cup

SAFF U-15 Championship

*Denotes draws includes knockout matches decided on penalty kicks. Red border indicates that the tournament was hosted on home soil. Gold, silver, bronze backgrounds indicates 1st, 2nd and 3rd finishes respectively. Bold text indicates best finish in tournament.

See also

 India national football team
 India national under-23 football team
 India national under-20 football team
 India women's national football team
 India women's national under-20 football team
 I-League U19

References

External links
 All India Football Federation website.

 
Youth football in India
Asian national under-17 association football teams
Football